Tula Regional Exotarium is the State organization of culture of the Tula Region, the Basic Laboratory of the Zoological Institute of the Russian Academy of Sciences, it is a cultural, educational, scientific and conservation center.

The Exotarium was opened on September 27, 1987, and now has the largest collection of snakes in the world, with more than 524 species and subspecies. According to the total number of animals, Tula Exotarium occupies the second place among the Zoos of Russia EARAZA.

Up to 90,000 people visit the Exotarium yearly.

History

In 1987 the first Zoo called Tula Exotarium was opened in Tula. At the time its collection consisted of 120 species of animals (fish, amphibians, reptiles, etc.). In 1989 a statue of a dinosaur appeared near the entrance as a symbol of this zoo's specialization in reptiles. From the start, the Exotarium began to cooperate actively with foreign colleagues, and in 1990 it received an accreditation from the Australian Society of Zoos. The Exotarium collection was regularly replenished with new species, and in 2000 it was recognized to have the largest collection of snakes in the world. In 1996 in connection with a difficult financial situation the Exotarium was put from self-financing to the regional budget financing. But it did not solve the main problem, which is the state of the old building. The current area of public exhibition is 253 square meters. 511 species of animals are kept, bred and studied here, and 90 000 people visit it every year. During these years many problems concerning construction of a new building have been solved. Thus e.g. a draft project has been approved; a hall of the future called "Tropical forest" was created at the public exhibit, besides, the place of the construction has been determined.

Scientific research
Successes in breeding of hundreds of species of reptiles from all the continents permitted  to receive offspring from dozens of species of reptiles for the first time in the world. Together with the leading Russian scientists from the Zoological Institute of the Russian Academy of Sciences (St. Petersburg) in Tula new methods of investigation of controversial and little-known taxa were worked out, three new species of snakes were described, more than 100 articles were published in Russian and foreign journals and two books. Together with the Russian Academy of Sciences and Vietnam the Exotarium was taking part in organization and conducting of International expeditions on studying of the most rich fauna of Vietnam in the course of 14 years. The Russian and Vietnamese herpetologists investigated a lot of mountain regions difficult to access where no scientific investigations had been conducted up to that moment. As a result, dozens new species of amphibians and reptiles were discovered and described. Many of them were captive-bred for the first time in the world practice in the laboratories of the Exotarium. Since 1987 researches of the fauna of the Tula Region have been made.

Public exhibition
Only the tenth part of the collection (namely 55 species) is shown at the public exhibition. Among them there is a two-meter long striped monitor lizard and a giant tortoise that weighs 135 kg, the largest one in the Zoos of Russia, as well as the species which offspring were got here for the first time in the world. For example, the long-nosed shrub racer, that had been considered as extinct, was discovered again by the collaborators of the Exotarium in Vietnam, and now due to successful breeding in Tula it has been kept and bred in many Zoos of the USA and Europe for many years now.

Work with visitors
Except for the public exhibition on their own or a review excursion, thematic excursions are offered to visitors; studies based on the contact with animals, competitions; festivals; temporal thematic exhibitions; events, devoted to the International campaigns, and also different programs and services for various categories of visitors are carried out.

Festivals, exhibitions and other events
Regularly exhibitions are organized at Exotarium, where it is possible to see very rare animals that are kept and bred in the closed scientific laboratories of the Exotarium. For example, in 2001 an exhibition-competition called International competition of beauty among snakes where visitors voted for the reptiles they liked best was organized. Different competitions and festivals are held at Exotarium, for example, competition of children’s pictures such as Zoos will save the world, Snakes’ day and Birthday of Exotarium. The Exotarium and its visitors take an active part in the International campaigns on conservation of endangered species of animals, for instance, in 2008 it took part in the campaign Year of the frog.

External links
 Official site

Buildings and structures in Tula Oblast
Zoos in Russia
Tourist attractions in Tula Oblast
Zoos established in 1987